This list of computer size categories attempts to list commonly used categories of computer by the physical size of the device and its chassis or case, in descending order of size. One generation's "supercomputer" is the next generation's "mainframe", and a "PDA" does not have the same set of functions as a "laptop", but the list still has value, as it provides a ranked categorization of devices. It also ranks some more obscure computer sizes. There are different sizes like-mini computers, microcomputer, mainframe computer and super computer.

Large computers 

 Supercomputer
 Minisupercomputer
 Mainframe computer

Midrange computer 

 Superminicomputer
 Minicomputer

Microcomputers 

 Interactive kiosk
 Arcade cabinet
 Personal computer (PC)
 Desktop computer—see computer form factor for some standardized sizes of desktop computers
 full-sized
 All-in-one 
 compact
 Home theater
 Home computer

Mobile computers 

 Desktop replacement computer or desknote
 Laptop computer
 Subnotebook computer, also known as a Kneetop computer; clamshell varieties may also be known as minilaptop or ultraportable laptop computers
 Tablet personal computer
 Handheld computers, which include the classes:
 Ultra-mobile personal computer, or UMPC
 Personal digital assistant or enterprise digital assistant, which include:
 HandheldPC or Palmtop computer
 Pocket personal computer
 Electronic organizer
 Pocket computer
 Calculator, which includes the class:
 Graphing calculator
 Scientific calculator
 Programmable calculator
 Accounting / Financial Calculator
 Handheld game console
 Portable media player
 Portable data terminal
 Handheld
 Smartphone, a class of mobile phone
 Feature phone
 Wearable computer
 Single-board computer
 Wireless sensor network components
 Plug computer
 Stick PC, a single-board computer in a small elongated casing resembling a stick
 Microcontroller
 Smartdust
 Nanocomputer

Others 

 Rackmount computer
 Blade server
 Blade PC
 Small form factor personal computer (SFF, ITX, DTX.etc.)

Distinctive marks 

The classes above are not rigid; there are "edge devices" in most of them. For instance, the "subnotebook" category can usually be distinguished from the "PDA" category because a subnotebook has a keyboard and a PDA has not; however, tablet PCs may be larger than subnotebooks (making it seemingly correct to classify them as laptops) and also lack a keyboard, while devices such as the Handspring Treo 600 have something that might charitably be called a keyboard, but are still definitely in the "smartphone" category.

In the higher end of the spectrum, this informal and somewhat humorous rule might help:

 You can throw a laptop if you wanted to
 You can lift a workstation if you need to
 You can tilt a minicomputer if you need to
 You cannot move a mainframe, even if you tried

Categories 
 :Category:Supercomputers
 :Category:Mainframe computers
 :Category:Minicomputers
 :Category:Portable computers
 :Category:Mobile computers
 :Category:Laptops
 :Category:Notebooks
 :Category:Tablet computers
 :Category:Subnotebooks
 :Category:Portable computers
 :Category:Pocket computers
 :Category:Personal digital assistants
 :Category:Calculators
 :Category:Handheld game consoles
 :Category:Information appliances
 :Category:Wearable computers
 :Category:Embedded systems
 :Category:Wireless sensor network

See also 
 Classes of computers
 Computer form factor
 Form factor (design)

References 

 List of computer size categories
Computer size categories